Tarantobelus jeffdanielsi is a species of nematode, and is one of only two species known to infect tarantulas.

History 
T. jeffdanielsi was discovered in 2018 when a wholesale breeder noticed white discharge in the mouths of their tarantulas, and strange behavior prior to death. This discharge were the nematodes in the tarantula's oral cavity.

Biology 
The nematodes infect the oral cavity of a tarantula. The host will begin to lose control of its appendages and fangs, causing starvation and a 'tip toe' like walking behavior. The nematodes only infect the tarantula's mouth, suggesting they may feed on bacteria that lives on tarantulas rather than the actual tarantula.

Taxonomy 
T. jeffdanielsi was named after actor Jeff Daniels for his role in the 1990 movie Arachnophobia.

References 

Tylenchida
Parasitic nematodes of animals
Animals described in 2022